Maria Schilder, née Hertrich (4 August 1898 – 30 July 1975) was a German malacologist and chemist. Along with her husband, Franz Alfred Schilder, she systematized molluscs having produced over 250 scientific papers, most on the living and fossil Cypraeidae, or cowries.

Life 
Maria Hertrich was born on 4 August 1898. She was from Munich. Around 1922 she married Franz Alfred Schilder. They had one daughter Franzisca who died in 1961.

Maria Schilder died 30 July 1975.

Work 
Being initially a chemist, Schilder switched her professional focus to the study of molluscs. Together with her husband, Franz Alfred, Schilder studied the family Cypraeidae, the cowries. The Schilders defined areas of endemism throughout the Indo-West Pacific based on mollusk distributions. Along with her husband, Schilder identified geographically distinct races (or subspecies) and recognized them taxonomically.

In “Revision of the Genus Monetaria (Cypraeidae)” they researched how Bergmann’s Rule applied to east coastal Australia where the shells are smaller in the warmer north. Together the Schilders wrote over 250 scientific papers, most on the living and fossil Cypraeidae, or cowries.

After the death of her husband, Schilder published A Catalog of Living and Fossil Cowries in 1971.

Schilder is honored in the cowry name Annepona mariae (Schilder, 1927) and her daughter Franzisca is honored in the cowry name Bistolida hirundo francisca (Schilder & Schilder, 1938).

Publications (selection) 

 1930 – Variationsstatistische studien an Monetaria annulus (Moll. Gastr. Cypraeidae) 
 1938 – Prodrome of a monograph on living Cypraeidae
 1949 – Beiträge zur taxonomischen Zoologie 
 1952 – Die Kaurischnecke
 1954 – Zahl und Verbreitung der Käfer 
 1971 – A catalogue of living and fossil cowries. Taxonomy and bibliography of Triviacea and Cypraeacea

References 

1898 births
1975 deaths
German malacologists
20th-century German chemists
German women chemists
20th-century German zoologists
20th-century German women scientists